Giuseppe Tominz, also known as Jožef Tominc (6 July 179024 April 1866), was an Italian-Slovene painter from the Austrian Littoral. He worked mostly in the cultural milieu of the upper bourgeoisie in the Austrian Illyrian Kingdom. He was one of the most prominent portraitists of the Biedermeier period. He became renowned for his realistic portraits. He worked mostly in the Austrian Littoral, but also produced religious paintings in Carniola and in Croatia. His handiwork can be seen in the Church of the Birth of the Blessed Virgin Mary in Donji Stoliv. Nowadays, many of his works are on display in the Revoltella Museum in Trieste, some in the National Gallery of Slovenia in Ljubljana, National Museum of Serbia and in the Museum of History and Art of Gorizia. He is considered part of both the Italian and the Slovenian national culture canon.

Biography

Giuseppe Tominz was born in Gorizia as the second of eleven children of Ivano Tominz, a dealer in ironware, and his wife Maria Anna ( Gioacchini) of Udine. He was educated in a bilingual environment. He attended a primary school run by Piarists in Gorizia, where he began to learn to paint in the third year. He received his first training as a painter from the local artist Karel Keber and probably also from the painter Franz Caucig.

In 1809, he left for Rome with the help of Austrian Archduchess Maria Anna, sister of Emperor Francis I of Austria, and count Francesco della Torre. In Rome, he studied painting with Domenico Conti Bazzani and in the Scuola del Nudo at the Accademia di San Luca. In 1814, he was awarded a silver medal for his drawing Study of the Apostople.

In 1816, he married Maria Ricci. In 1818, they had twin sons. That year, Tominz returned with his family to Gorizia. Of his early artistic works, several anatomical studies, sketches and one of his landscapes View of Vietri, Rieti and the Salerno Bay have survived.

In 1819, Tominz lived for some time in Vienna. From 1821 to 1823, he lived occasionally in Ljubljana, where he exhibited his works and painted portraits of nobles, members of the bourgeoisie, religious dignitaries and participants at the Congress of Laibach. Between 1830 and 1855, he lived and worked in Trieste. He later moved back to Gorizia, and finally to his estate in Gradišče nad Prvačino (Gradiscutta, in Italian), where he died in 1866.

Work

Tominz's early works include portraits of members of the nobility and bourgeoisie, but also of simple people. His influence can be seen in the works of the Slovene painters  and Michael Stroy.

The style of Tominz's portraits was influenced by late Classicism and by the style of Viennese portrait artists of the Biedermeier period. The people in his portraits have sharp features and clear forms, but despite this the depictions are realistic, sometimes with an ironic touch. The backgrounds are filled with landscapes or the city from which the person depicted originated.

Tominz also included objects that hint at the profession or the lifestyle of the person depicted. Inspired by Jean Auguste Dominique Ingres or Vincenzo Camuccini, he used cool colours and plastic models of people. He is however best known for his oil painting technique, his precise skills of observation and his rapid style.

When depicting religious motifs, Tominzc relied on graphical templates, the old Italian masters and Nazarene painters. Amongst his numerous sacred works are altars and other pictures for churches in Gorizia, Prvačina, Aquileia, Kanal ob Soči, Gradisca d'Isonzo, and elsewhere.

Works

Woman with White Turban
Lady with Camellia
Dr. Frušić with Family
Portrait of Petar II Petrović-Njegoš, 1833
The Wife of Mayor Sancin
Cäcilia Countess of Auersperg, mother of Count Anton Alexander von AuerspergThree Ladies from the Moscon FamilyNikola LazarevićMarija LazarevićCapetan PolićMan with Letter (Self-Portrait)Self-Portrait at the WindowSelf-Portrait (On the toilet)Portrait of Father Portrait of Ciriaco Catraro

Gallery

See also
Portrait of the Artist's Father

References

Further reading
 Alfredo Entità, Retrospettiva a Gorizia del ritrattista Tominz; Corriere di Sicilia, Catania, 2 novembre 1966
 Alfredo Entità, Realtà e penetrazione nella ritrattistica di Tominz; Corriere di Sicilia, Catania 5 novembre 1966
 Maria Masau Dan, Susanna Gregorat, Nicoletta Bressan, Raffaella Sgubin, Piera Zanei Giuseppe Tominz. "L'arte delle virtù Borghesi" edizione Le Generali, Trieste, 2002
 Giuseppe Pavanello e Fabrizio Magani "Ottocento di frontiera: Gorizia 1780 - 1850". Arte e cultura Milano Electa, 1995
 Remigio Marini, "Giuseppe Tominz",  Firenze, 1950.
 Simona Rinaldi, "Giuseppe Tominz a Roma : metodi esecutivi nei dipinti dell'Ottocento", Firenze, 2010.
 Renato Barilli, "Il primo ottocento italiano, la pittura fra passato e futuro", Milano, Mazzotta editore, 1992
 Laura Ruaro Loseri, "Ritratti a Trieste", Roma, Editalia Gruppo Istituto Poligrafico e Zecca dello Stato, 1993
 Nicoletta Bressan, Barbara Jaki, Susanna Gregorats, Jožef Tominc: Fiziognomija slike. Ljubljana, 2002.
 Enciklopedija Slovenije, s.v. "Bidermajer" in "Jožef Tominc".
 Slovenski biografski leksikon, s.v. "Jožef Tominc".
 Barbara Jaki, Meščanska slika : Slikarstvo prve polovice 19. stoletja iz zbirk Narodne galerije. Ljubljana, 2000.
 Ivan Sedej, Sto znanih slovenskih umetniških slik''. Ljubljana, 1985.

External links

1790 births
1866 deaths
18th-century Italian painters
Italian male painters
19th-century Italian painters
People from Gorizia
Biedermeier painters
Italian Slovenes
Slovenian painters
Slovenian male painters
19th-century Slovenian painters
19th-century Italian male artists
18th-century Italian male artists